AP French may refer to:
AP French Language, commonly known as "AP French"

See also
 AP French Literature
 Associated Press, for AP in France
 Agence France-Presse (AFP), the equivalent of Associated Press in France